Salem Memorial Airport  is a city-owned, public-use airport located four nautical miles (5 mi, 7 km) southwest of the central business district of Salem, a city in Dent County, Missouri, United States. It is included in the National Plan of Integrated Airport Systems for 2011–2015, which categorized it as a general aviation facility.

Facilities and aircraft 
Salem Memorial Airport covers an area of 86 acres (35 ha) at an elevation of 1,241 feet (378 m) above mean sea level. It has one runway designated 17/35 with an asphalt surface measuring 2,998 by 60 feet (914 x 18 m).

For the 12-month period ending December 31, 2012, the airport had 4,550 aircraft operations, an average of 12 per day: 99% general aviation and 1% military. At that time there were nine aircraft based at this airport: 44% single-engine, 33% helicopter, and 22% multi-engine.

References

External links 
 Airport page at City of Salem website
 Salem Memorial (K33) at Missouri DOT Airport Directory
 Aerial image as of February 1995 from USGS The National Map
 
 

Airports in Missouri
Buildings and structures in Dent County, Missouri